2009 Big East Tournament  may refer to:
2009 Big East men's basketball tournament
2009 Big East women's basketball tournament